David Lord may refer to:

David Lord (RAF officer) (1913–1944), British air force officer and Victoria Cross recipient
David Lord (producer) (born 1944), English composer
David Lord (rower) (1929–1998), South African rower